Noam Debaisieux (born 15 December 1999) is a Belgian professional footballer who plays as an attacking midfielder for Royal Dottignies.

Professional career
Debaisieux made his professional debut for Royal Excel Mouscron on 14 May 2017 in a playoff against K.R.C. Genk. On 21 June 2017, Debaisieux signed his first professional contract with Royal Excel Mouscron. 

Debaisieux wasn't a part of the first team Royal Excel Mouscron since the beginning of the 2018/19 season and therefore, he was loaned out on 18 January 2019 to K.S.K. Ronse for the rest of the season. He stayed at the club at the end of the loan spell. 

In February 2020 it was confirmed, that Debaisieux would join Royal Dottignies Sport in July 2020.

References

External links
 
 Sport.Be Profile
 FC Metz Profile
 L'Equipe Profile

1999 births
Living people
Belgian footballers
Royal Excel Mouscron players
K.S.K. Ronse players
Belgian Pro League players
Association football midfielders